Tyrrelstown is a townland in the civil parish of Mulhuddart, located 13 km northwest of the city of Dublin in Ireland and often considered as part of the greater Blanchardstown area. It is the site of a planned suburban development from the early 2000s. The local authority for the area, which forms part of the Dublin 15 postal district, is Fingal County Council.

Location
Tyrrelstown is located south of Hollystown Golf Course, north of Mulhuddart, west of Cruiserath and lies between the N3 and the M2.

Located nearby is Damastown Industrial Estate, one of Dublin's largest industrial estates, which includes a major IBM campus, employing over 4,000 people. In Cruiserath, also nearby, there are premises for the pharmaceutical corporation Bristol-Myers Squibb, while beyond is Blanchardstown Corporate Park which features offices belonging to PayPal and Ask.Com.

History
Tyrrelstown (often also spelt as Tyrellstown or Tyrrellstown) derives its name from that of the Tyrrell family, including Hugh Tyrrel, who was granted lands in the parishes of Clonsilla and Mulhuddart in 1178 by Hugh de Lacy, Lord of Meath. John Tirel, or Tyrrell, was Lord Chief Justice in the  1380s and 1390s. Tyrrelstown is historically part of the barony of Castleknock within the traditional County Dublin. Much of the area's history is intertwined with that of Cruiserath, Castleknock, Mulhuddart and other adjacent places. To the south is Tyrrelstown House, which dates back to 1720 and which is listed on the Record of Protected Structures for Fingal. About 1580 Tyrrelstown was granted to the Bellings family, whose most prominent member was Richard Bellings, one of the leaders of Confederate Ireland.

Amenities

Education
The district has a secondary school, nowadays vested in 'The Le Cheile Schools Trust', and four national schools: two under the patronage of Educate Together, including Tyrrelstown ET NS, St Luke's NS adjacent, under Roman Catholic patronage, and one under the patronage of the Gaelscoileanna organisation. Tyrrelstown Educate Together NS and St Luke's NS were both "rapid built" by Western Building Systems of Dungannon, and were temporarily closed in October 2018 due to fire safety concerns.

Sport
There is a GAA club, Tyrrelstown GAA, playing football and hurling for boys and girls up to Under 15.

There is a Foróige youth service located in the local community centre and it is aimed at young people between the ages of 10–18. "Foróige is the leading youth organisation in Ireland". It has been running many youth clubs, programmes and facilities for young people in Ireland since 1952.

A local soccer club, Tyrrelstown FC, formerly had two senior teams playing in the Athletic Union League and a schoolboy team playing in the Dublin and District Schoolboys League, but is no longer active (as of 2022).

Commercial
The retail facilities that serve the residents (Tyrrelstown Town Centre, "Carlton Hotel" a creche, Lidl and SuperValu supermarkets) are actually located in the neighbouring townlands of Hollywood-Rath and Cruiserath.

Transport
Tyrrelstown is served primarily by the regular 40D Dublin Bus route from Dublin City Centre. In addition, the 40E links the area with the Luas at Broombridge and the 238 service links the area with Blanchardstown Shopping Centre and Ladyswell.

A new N2 - N3 link road was completed in May 2013 and passes by Tyrrelstown, improving the development linkages to the M2 (Dublin-north east motorway). By road it is accessible via Mulhuddart, Hollystown and Cruiserath.

References

External links

Tyrrelstown Residents Association

Townlands of the barony of Castleknock
Places in Fingal